The 2012 FIRS Senior Men's Inline Hockey World Championships was the 18th World Championships, an annual international inline hockey tournament. It took place between 8–14 July 2012 in Colombia.

United States won the tournament by defeating Canada 6–4 in the Final game to capture their 14th title; the Americans finished the tournament undefeated with a record of 6–0–0. The Czech Republic captured the bronze medal by defeating Italy 4–3 in the bronze medal game. The tournament's top scorer was Colombia's Nicolas Fierro Torres. United States' Dustin Roux was named the most valuable player of the tournament.

Venues
All games were played at the Coliseo Bicentenario in Bucaramanga, Colombia.

Rosters

Each team's roster for the 2012 FIRS Senior Men's Inline Hockey World Championships consisted of at least 6 skaters (forwards, and defencemen) and 2 goaltenders, and at most 14 skaters and 2 goaltenders. All sixteen participating nations, through the confirmation of their respective national associations, had to submit a roster prior to the event.

Nations
The following 16 nations qualified for the tournament. 1 nation from Australia, 6 nations from Europe, 3 nations from North American and 6 nations from South America are represented.

Australia
 
Europe
 
 
 
 
 
 
North America
 
 
 
South America

Officials

Seedings and groupings
The seeding in the preliminary round was based on the 2012 FIRS World Championship final rankings. The teams were grouped by seeding (in parenthesis is the corresponding final ranking).

Group 1

Pool A
  (1)
  (4)
  (5)
  (10)

Pool B
  (2)
  (3)
  (6)
  (7)

Group 2

Pool C
  (11)
  (16)
  (B)
  (L)

Pool D
  (12)
  (13)
  (C)
  (E)

5th through 8th placement round

13th through 16th placement round

Ranking and statistics

Tournament awards
 Best players selected by the tournament directors:
 Best Goalkeeper:  Dylan Ellis
 Most Valuable Player:  Dustin Roux
 Fair Play:

Final standings
The official FIRS final standings of the tournament:

Scoring leaders
List shows the top skaters sorted by points, then goals. If the list exceeds 10 skaters because of a tie in points, all of the tied skaters are shown.

GP = Games played; G = Goals; A = Assists; Pts = Points; +/− = Plus/minus; PIM = Penalties in minutes; POS = Position

See also 
 FIRS Inline Hockey World Championships
 List of FIRS Senior Men's Inline Hockey World Championships medalists

External links
 Official website

FIRS World Championship
2012 FIRS World Championship
Inline hockey in Colombia
2012 in Colombian sport
Inline hockey tournaments